Extremes Meet is a 1928 comedy thriller novel by the British writer Compton Mackenzie. It set in Southeastern Europe, and features the fictional British spy Roger Waterson who subsequently appeared in a sequel The Three Couriers published the following year.

References

Bibliography
 Burton, Alan. Historical Dictionary of British Spy Fiction. Rowman & Littlefield, 2016.

1928 British novels
Novels by Compton Mackenzie
British thriller novels
British spy novels
Cassell (publisher) books